Carla Olson is a Los Angeles-based songwriter, performer and producer. Her discography consists of 10 studio albums, 4 live albums, and 4 compilations. In addition, she has been featured as a performer and producer on many albums by other artists.

Studio albums
 1987: So Rebellious a Lover (Rhino Records) with Gene Clark
 1989: Carla Olson aka Rubies & Diamonds (Amigo, Sweden) / (Sunset Blvd Records)
 1993: Within an Ace (Watermelon Records)
 1994: Reap the Whirlwind (Sky Ranch)
 2001: The Ring of Truth (Smile / Evangeline)
 2013: Have Harmony, Will Travel (Busted Flat)
 2017: Rubies & Diamonds (Sunset Blvd Records)
 2019: The Hidden Hills Sessions (Red Parlor Records) with Todd Wolfe
 2020: Have Harmony, Will Travel 2 (Sunset Blvd Records)
 2022: “Night Comes Falling” duet album with Stephen McCarthy (BFD Records)
 2023: "Have Harmony, Will Travel 3" is due in the summer and includes a co~written duet with Allan Clarke, members of Broken Homes, as well as Jake Andrews, Robert Rex Waller Jr, and Shawn Barton Vach.  (record label to be announced)

Live
 1990: Live (Demon) with Mick Taylor
 1991: Live: Too Hot for Snakes (Razor Edge) with Mick Taylor - recorded March 4, 1990, at the Roxy Theatre, Hollywood, CA - reissued as “Sway ~ The Best Of Carla Olson & Mick Taylor” with additional track.
 1992: Silhouetted in Light: Live in Concert (Demon) with Gene Clark
 2007: In Concert (Collectors' Choice Music) with Gene Clark

Compilations
 1995: Special - The Best of Carla Olson (Virgin)
 1995: Wave of the Hand: The Best of Carla Olson (Watermelon)
 1995: The Best of Carla Olson - Gotta Get Back Home (Bad News)
 2001: Honest as Daylight: The Best of Carla Olson 1981-2000 (Houston Party) - includes 3 previously unreleased tracks and 2 alternate mixes of songs from Within an Ace
 2022:  Sway The Best of Carla Olson & Mick Taylor Live (Sunset Blvd Records)

EPs
 1992: Sing 3 Songs by The Byrds (Demon) with Gene Clark - "I'll Feel a Whole Lot Better" / "Set You Free This Time" / "She Don't Care about Time"

As a member of the Textones

Albums
 1984: Midnight Mission (Gold Mountain) - reissued on Omnivore in 2015 with 5 extra tracks
 1987: Cedar Creek (Enigma) - reissued on Omnivore in 2015 with a 1987 performance from the Catalyst, Santa Cruz, CA
 2008: Live & Unreleased (Collector's Choice)
 2013: Have Harmony, Will Travel (Busted Flat Records) - duets with Juice Newton, Peter Case, Richie Furay. Gene Clark, and others.
 2018: Old Stone Gang (Blue Elan Records) - with guests including past members of Textones as well as Barry Goldberg, Allan Clarke (of the Hollies), and Rusty Young (of Poco).
 2020: Have Harmony, Will Travel 2 (Sunset Blvd. Records) - duets with Timothy B. Schmit, Peter Noone, Terry Reid, Percy Sledge, and others.

Singles
 1980: "Some Other Girl" / "Reason to Leave" (I.R.S. / Faulty)
 1980: "I Can't Fight It" / "Vacation" / "The Time Is Right" (Chiswick)
 1982: "Vacation" / "The Time Is Right" (Big Beat) - with Kathy Valentine
 1984: "Midnight Mission" / "Upset Me" (Gold Mountain)
 1984: "Midnight Mission" (Gold Mountain) - 12" single - two remixes

Compilations
 1989: Through the Canyon (Rhino)
 1990: Back in Time (Demon) - previously unreleased tracks recorded from 1979 to 1988.

As composer
 1986: Eric Johnson - Tones (Reprise) - track 6, "Trail Of Tears" (co-written with Eric Johnson and Stephen Barber)
 1986: Melissa - III (Sono-Rodven) - track 11, "Standing In The Line"
 1994: Percy Sledge - Blue Night (Sky Ranch / Virgin) - track 3, "Why Did You Stop"; track 10, "The Grand Blvd." (co-written with George Green)
 2004: Percy Sledge - Shining Through the Rain (Varèse Sarabande) - track 5, "Misty Morning" (co-written with Hasse Huss and Mikael Rickfors); track 9, "Rubies & Diamonds" (co-written George Callins); track 13, "Road of No Return (co-written with Mikael Rickfors)
 2005: Eric Johnson - Live from Austin, TX (New West) - track 4, "Trail of Tears" (co-written with Eric Johnson and Stephen Barber)
 2019: Allan Clarke - "Resurgence" BMG Records - Hearts Of Stone - co-written with Allan Clarke and Francis Haines

As producer
 1997:[Mikael Rickfors - Happy Man Don't Kill (Sonet)
 1998: Mare Winningham - Lonesomers (Razor & Tie)
 1999: Davis Gaines - All My Tomorrows (Lap)
 2001: Phil Upchurch - Tell the Truth! (Evidence)
 2001: various artists - Blue Xmas: Christmas Blues Instrumentals (Evidence)
 2002: Barry Goldberg - Stoned Again (Antone's) featuring Denny Freeman, Mick Taylor.
 2002: Jake Andrews - Jake Andrews (Texas Music Group)
 2002: Joe Louis Walker - Paso Tiempo (Evidence Music) featuring Ernie Watts, Wallace Roney.
 2002: various artists - Hey Bo Diddley: A Tribute (Evidence)
 2008: Doña Oxford - Step Up (Fountainbleau)
 2009: Paul Jones Starting All Over Again (Collectors' Choice Music in the U.S., CRS in Europe) featuring Jake Andrews, Mikael Rickfors, Eric Clapton.
 2012: Ana Gazzola - Musicas E Palavras Dos Bee Gees (Fuel 2000) featuring Eric Johnson, Peter Leinheiser, Laurence Juber.
 2012: Chubby Tavares - Jealousy (Fuel 2000)
 2013: Carla Olson - "Have Harmony, Will Travel" - (Busted Flat) - featuring Peter Case, Richie Furay, James Intveld, Scott Kempner, Gary Myrick, Juice Newton, Robert Rex Waller Jr, John York.
 2015: Paul Jones - Suddenly I Like It (Continental Blue Heaven) - released in the Netherlands and featuring Joe Bonamassa, Jools Holland.
 2018: Barry Goldberg - "In the Groove" (Sunset Blvd Records) - featuring Denny Freeman, James Inveldt, Les McCann.
 2018: Big Kettle Drum - "I Thought You'd Be Bigger"
 2019: Ash Grunwald - "Mojo"
 2020: Carla Olson - "Have Harmony, Will Travel 2" (Sunset Blvd Records) featuring Ana Gazzola, Stephen McCarthy, Jim Muske, Peter Noone, Terry Reid, Timothy B. Schmit. 
 2021: Americana Railroad (BMG Records) - featuring Dave Alvin, James Intveld, Gary Myrick, Stephen McCarthy, Robert Rex Waller Jr, John York.
 2021: Ladies Sing Lightfoot - featuring Kristi Callan, Susan Cowsill, Natalie Noone, Shawn Barton Vach, Darling West, Ana Gazzola, Ilsey Juber, Maura Kennedy, Sarah Kramer, Arwen Lewis, Katy Moffatt, 
      
 2021: Kris Wiley (Continental Record Services, Holland)
 2022: Stephen McCarthy & Carla Olson - "Night Comes Falling" (BFD Records)
 2023: Jake Andrews - "Train Back Home" (BFD Records)
 2023: Robert Rex Waller Jr - "See The Big Man Cry" (BFD Records)

As primary artist/song contributor
 1993: various artists - Conmemorativo: A Tribute to Gram Parsons (Rhino) - track 11, "Do You Know How It Feels to Be Lonesome?"
 1995: various artists - Sing Hollies in Reverse (Eggbert) - track 17, "Touch"
 2000: various artists - Full Circle: A Tribute to Gene Clark (Not Lame) - track 2-17, "After the Storm"

Also appears on
 1980: Phil Seymour - Phil Seymour (Boardwalk Entertainment) - lead guitar on track 8, "We Don't Get Along"
 1991: The Droogs - Guerrilla Love-In (Music Maniac) - vocals on track 7, "Morning Dew"
 1994: Percy Sledge - Blue Night (Sky Ranch / Virgin) - guitar, vocals
 1996: Mark Lindsay - Video Dreams ('Alala) - guitar, vocals
 2001: Brian Joens - Hollywoodland (Spinout) - vocals
 2005: Dwight Twilley - Have a Twilley Christmas (Digital Musicworks) - vocals
 2011: Jon Emery - A Thousand Sad Goodbyes: Jon Emery Sings the Songs of Gene Clark (E Records) - vocals

Sources

External links

 http://www.carlaolson.com

 
 
The Textones at Last.fm

Discographies of American artists
Rock music discographies